Frank Hogan (born 28 October 1936) is a former  Australian rules footballer who played with South Melbourne in the Victorian Football League (VFL).

Hogan played 14 Melbourne Premier Cricket first eleven games with South Melbourne.

Hogan played with West Adelaide Football Club from 1960 to 1962, playing in two SANFL grand finals, with a premiership in 1961. He played 58 games and kicked 120 goals in his three years with West Adelaide.

Hogan also played first eleven cricket with the Adelaide Cricket Club in 1960.

Hogan coached Tatura Football Club in 1963, then played in two consecutive Ovens and Murray Football League premierships for Wangaratta Rovers Football Club, in 1964 and 1965, coached Beechworth Football Club in 1966, then coached Redan Football Club to runners up in the Ballarat Football League in 1967.

Brother of former South Melbourne footballers, Pat Hogan and Kevin Hogan.

Notes

External links 

Frank Hogan. A Class Act. @On Reflection

Living people
1936 births
Australian rules footballers from Victoria (Australia)
Sydney Swans players
Benalla Football Club players
West Adelaide Football Club players